Nord Anglia International School Dublin is a private international school that serves primary and secondary students. The school opened in 2018 and is located in the Leopardstown suburb of Dublin in Ireland.

It provides schooling for children from 3 years of age up to high school level (to age 16-18) and is the only school in Ireland to offer the International Baccalaureate for students from the preschool level through to secondary school.

It is privately funded by fees (the highest in Ireland) so the Department of Education does not perform oversight of the school, because it does not receive public funding.

The school building is 8,175 square metres, set on a  campus. It includes facilities for teaching science, technology, engineering, art and maths.

References 

Primary schools in Dún Laoghaire–Rathdown
Secondary schools in Dún Laoghaire–Rathdown
International schools in the Republic of Ireland
Private schools in the Republic of Ireland
Leopardstown
Nord Anglia Education